Nothing to Lose is the last independent album recorded by Sanctus Real before signing their record deal with Sparrow Records. The album was sold at live concerts in the Northwestern Ohio, Northern Indiana and Southern Michigan areas. Six tracks were re-recorded for the album Say it Loud. The track "Message" was re-recorded for the album Fight the Tide.

Track listing

Personnel 
 Matt Hammit – Vocals
 Chris Rohman – Guitars
 Mark Graalman – Drums
 Steve Goodrum – Bass

Production
 Skidd Mills – Production and Mixing
 Brad Blackwood – Mastering
 Jim Rohman Photography – Cover and Live Photos
 Chris Rohman – Design and layout
 Dan Weeks – Mechanical layout

References 

2001 albums
Sanctus Real albums